Pilodeudorix ula, the cobalt playboy, is a butterfly in the family Lycaenidae. It is found in Nigeria (west and the Cross River loop), Cameroon, Gabon, the Republic of the Congo, the Central African Republic, the Democratic Republic of the Congo and western Uganda. The habitat consists of primary forests.

References

Butterflies described in 1895
Deudorigini
Butterflies of Africa